In 1977 Madison Square Garden (MSG) announced Gold Ticket Awards would be given to performers who had brought in more than 100,000 unit ticket sales to the venue. Since the arena's seating capacity is about 20,000, this would require a minimum of five sold-out shows. To publicize the announcement, the first Gold Ticket Award was given to WNEW-FM, in recognition of the station's tenth anniversary, during intermission at the October 17, 1977 Emerson, Lake & Palmer concert at the venue. It was also announced that performers who had already hit the 100,000-plus mark would receive the award at future dates. Artists in that group included Chicago, John Denver, Peter Frampton, the Rolling Stones, The Jackson 5, Elton John, Led Zeppelin, Sly Stone, Jethro Tull, The Who, and Yes. Typically, artists received their awards during their appearances at Madison Square Garden. In a 2014 interview, Graeme Edge, drummer for the Moody Blues, said his gold ticket from Madison Square Garden was his "most interesting piece of memorabilia" from his career. He explained that what made it interesting is that the ticket can be used to attend any event at the Garden. He has never used it for that, mainly because he doesn't live close to the venue.

Madison Square Garden also gave Platinum Ticket Awards to performers who sold over 250,000 tickets to their shows throughout the years. Winners of the Platinum Ticket Awards include: the Rolling Stones (1981), Elton John (1982), Yes (1984), Billy Joel (1984), and The Grateful Dead (1987).

Besides its Gold and Platinum Ticket Awards, Madison Square Garden has also recognized some performers by inducting them into the Madison Square Garden Hall of Fame. In the same October 1977 issue of Billboard magazine that reported MSG's announcement of the new Gold Ticket Award, for which he was eligible, Elton John was reported to be the first non-sports figure inducted into the MSG Hall of Fame for "record attendance of 140,000" in June of that year. Now . For their achievement of "13 consecutive sell-out concerts" at the venue, the Rolling Stones were inducted into the MSG Hall of Fame in 1984, along with nine sports figures. Now, Harry Styles joins the people who have had some recognition for MSG, selling out 15 nights at "Madison Square Garden" selling 300,000 tickets, the first artist to do so

MSG Gold Ticket Awards of note 
According to the American Society of Composers, Authors and Publishers (ASCAP), Earth, Wind & Fire were the "first black performers" to receive the MSG Gold Ticket Award. Billboard magazine, however, reported that both The Jackson 5 and Sly Stone were eligible as of October 17, 1977, when the award was first announced. The Jacksons received their award in 1981.

Billy Joel received the award after selling out Madison Square Garden for five nights in a row in 1980. In 2018 Joel played his 100th show at MSG, the record for most lifetime performances there.

The Grateful Dead were presented the award after selling out two MSG engagements in one year: the first was a two-night run in January 1979, and the second was a three-night stand in September. They had not played at MSG prior to the January engagement. Tickets for each show sold out the same day they went on sale.

Bruce Springsteen was the first performer who had participated in two different "events" that received the award: his own appearances at Madison Square Garden from 1978 into 1980, and his appearances in the "No Nukes" Concerts in September 1979. Phil Collins has also been a dual recipient of the award, in 1986 as a member of Genesis, and again in 1990 as a solo performer.

Awardees

Others Eligible 

Harry Styles 2022, received another recognition for selling out 15 nights at Madison Square Garden, selling 300,000 tickets on his Love On Tour

References 

Madison Square Garden
Awards established in 1977